Bradley S. James is a United States Marine Corps major general who most recently served as the Commander of United States Marine Corps Forces Korea from May 30, 2019 to June 27, 2022. Previously, he served as the Commanding General of the 4th Marine Aircraft Wing until April 13, 2019. Bradley assumed command of the 4th MAW from Major General William T. Collins on April 29, 2016. He also served as acting commander of Marine Forces Reserve from November 2018 to May 2019.

Raised in Austell, Georgia, James graduated from Kennesaw State University. After joining the Marine Corps, he completed flight training in 1988. Bradley has logged over 5000 flight hours as a KC-130 aerial refueling pilot.

References

External links

Year of birth missing (living people)
Living people
Place of birth missing (living people)
People from  Austell, Georgia
Kennesaw State University alumni
United States Naval Aviators
Recipients of the Air Medal
Recipients of the Meritorious Service Medal (United States)
Recipients of the Legion of Merit
United States Marine Corps generals